Beginning in 1925, some members of higher levels of the German nobility joined the Nazi Party, registered by their title, date of birth, NSDAP Party registration number, and date of joining the Nazi Party, from the registration of their first prince (Ernst) into NSDAP in 1928, until the end of World War II in 1945.

Following Kaiser Wilhelm II's abdication and the German Revolution, all German nobility as a legally defined class was abolished. On promulgation of the Weimar Constitution on 11 September 1919, all such Germans were declared equal before the law. There were 22 heads of these former federal states, titled as the 4 Kings of Germany; Prussia, Bavaria, Saxony, and Württemberg, there were also 6 Grand Dukes, 5 Dukes, and 7 Princes, who along with all of their heirs, successors and families, lost their titles and domains. In appeasement of such losses, Hitler, Goering, Himmler, and other Nazi leaders, frequently appealed to these (former) princes, and especially to Wilhelm II and his families from the former Prussian kingdom, by expressing sympathy for a restoration of their abolished monarchies, and such lost inheritances.

From 1925, the newly formed Nazi Party began accepting these princes by their (abolished) former titles, and by their (abolished) princedoms, and registering these dukes, princes, and princesses as such, in the Nazi Party. There are two known Nazi Party lists of such princes and princedoms. Of the first list Historian Malinowski notes: "of 312 families of the old aristocracy 3,592 princes joined the Nazis (26.9%) before Hitler came to power in 1933." The second Berlin Federal archives list depicts 270 princely members of the Nazi Party (1928–1942), of which almost half joined the Nazis pre-Hitler. The Berlin list named 90 direct senior heirs, to their 22 abolished princedoms, and also included claimants to the (former) Imperial Crown of Wilhelm II. After the proposed Prussian – "fourth Kaiser" died in the Wehrmacht in 1940, Hitler issued the Prinzenerlass, prohibiting German princes from the Wehrmacht, but not from the Nazi Party, SA or SS. Some German states provided a proportionally higher number of SS officers, including Hesse-Nassau and Lippe. Such German princes included SS–Obergruppenführer and Higher SS and Police Leader Josias, Hereditary Prince of Waldeck and Pyrmont.

German Empire and Kingdom of Prussia

(Abolished 9 November 1918)

Wilhelm II, German Emperor issued his statement of abdication on 28 November 1918, from both the Kingdom of Prussia, and imperial thrones, thus formally ending the House of Hohenzollern's 400-year rule over Prussia. He also gave up his, and future succession rights to the throne of Prussia and to the German Imperial throne connected therewith.

William, German Crown Prince was first son and heir of Prussia and the collective Kaiserreich of Kaiser Wilhelm II. The Crown Prince is known to have abdicated around the same time as his father in 1918. Prince William was a military commander, as second in command to his Commander in Chief father, with Generalfeldmarschall Crown Prince Rupprecht of Bavaria and Generalfeldmarschall Albrecht, Duke of Württemberg, at German military headquarters throughout WWI, until the allied armistice of 11 November 1918. As such, Wilhelm II and Crown Prince William directly commanded their Chief of General Staff, General Paul von Hindenburg throughout WWI. In 1933, von Hindenburg appointed (Nazi Party Leader) Hitler as the new Chancellor of Germany. On Hindenburg's death, Hitler officially became Führer and Chancellor of the Realm/Reich. Previously in Germany (1871–1918), the Chancellor was only responsible to the Prussian Kaiser (as Leader of the reich). In 1933, the Nazi regime abolished the flag of the Weimar Republic, and officially restored the Imperial Prussian flag, alongside the Swastika.

An earlier meeting with a (later) senior Nazi figure occurred in 1916, when Crown Prince William invested Hermann Wilhelm Göring with his Iron Cross, first class, after Göring flew reconnaissance and bombing missions in a Feldflieger Abteilung 25 (FFA 25) – in Crown Prince William's Fifth Army. Like many veterans, Göring believed the Stab-in-the-back legend, that the WWI German Army had not really lost the war, but was betrayed by Marxists, Jews, and especially Republicans, who had overthrown the German monarchy. In 1933, with Hitler and the Nazi Party in power, Göring was appointed as Minister of the Interior for Prussia, for which he established a Prussian police force called the Geheime Staatspolizei, or Gestapo. The headquarters of Reich Security Main Office, SD, Gestapo and SS in Nazi Germany (1933–1945), was symbolically housed at Prinz Albrecht-Strasse, off Wilhelmstraße, in Berlin.  

In the early 1930s, Wilhelm II apparently hoped the successes of the German Nazi Party would stimulate interest in a restoration of the monarchy, with Crown Prince William's son as the fourth Kaiser. After Crown Prince Wilhelm joined the Stahlhelm which merged in 1931 into the Harzburg Front, Adolf Hitler visited the former Crown Prince at Cecilienhof three times, in 1926, in 1933 (on the "Day of Potsdam") and in 1935. In May 1940, Prince Wilhelm of Prussia, the son of Crown Prince William, nominated by Wilhelm as the fourth Kaiser, took part in the invasion of France. He was wounded during the fighting in Valenciennes and died on 26 May 1940. The service drew over 50,000 mourners. His death and the ensuing sympathy of the German public toward a member of the former German royal house greatly bothered Hitler, and he began to see the Hohenzollerns as a threat to his power. In 1940 Hitler issued the Prinzenerlass, prohibiting princes from German royal houses from military service in the Wehrmacht.

Prince August Wilhelm of Prussia was the fourth son of Emperor Wilhelm II, by his first wife, Augusta Victoria. In 1933 August Wilhelm had a position in the Prussian state, and became a member of the German Reichstag. The former prince hoped "that Hitler would one day hoist him or his son Alexander up to the vacant throne of the Kaiser". In 1939 August Wilhelm was made an SA-Obergruppenführer, the second highest SA rank. Translated as "senior group leader", Obergruppenführer was a Nazi Party paramilitary rank first created in 1932 as a rank of the SA, and adopted by the Schutzstaffel one year later. Until 1942, it was the highest commissioned SS rank, inferior only to Reichsführer-SS Heinrich Himmler.
As listed, Prince August was given Nazi Party membership number 24, at number 12 was SS-Obergruppenführer Philipp Bouhler. He was a SS-Reichsleiter, (the same SS rank as Himmler and Goebbels), he was second only to the rank of the Führer in the Nazi Party. Philipp Bouhler, worked alongside Philipp, Landgrave of Hesse who was a close friend of Göring. Bouhler was head of Nazi Action T4 euthanasia program for children and the handicapped; (70,000 murders). Deputy Führer to Hitler, also ranked SS-Obergruppenführer, and also SS-Reichsleiter, Rudolf Hesse was number 16. Hesse and Hitler, like Göring, held a shared belief in the stab-in-the-back myth, that Germany's loss in WWI was caused by a conspiracy of Jews and Bolsheviks rather than a military defeat.

After the death of Prince August's father, Kaiser Wilhelm II in 1942, more so after making derogatory remarks about Joseph Goebbels, Prince August was denounced in 1942, side-lined and also banned from making public speeches. In 1945, with former Crown Princess Cecilie, August Wilhelm fled the approaching Red Army to Kronberg to take refuge with his aunt Princess Margaret of Prussia.

Prince Alexander Ferdinand was the only son of Prince August Wilhelm and his wife Princess Alexandra Victoria. In 1939, Prince Alexander was a first lieutenant in the Air Force Signal Corps. Like his father, Prince August hope that Hitler "would one day hoist him, or his son, up to the vacant throne of the Kaiser". Prince Alexander and his fathers support for the Nazis, caused disagreements among the Hohenzollerns, with Wilhelm II urging them both to leave the Nazi party. In 1933, Prince Alexander quit the SA and became a private in the German regular army. In 1934, Berlin leaked out that the prince quit the SA because Hitler had chosen 21-year-old Alexander Ferdinand to succeed him as "head man in Germany when he [Hitler] no longer can carry the torch". The report said Joseph Goebbels was expected to oppose the prince's nomination. Unlike many princes untrusted and removed from their commands by Hitler, Prince Alexander was the only Hohenzollern allowed to remain at his post.

Kingdom of Bavaria

(Abolished 13 November 1918)

King Ludwig III

King Ludwig III of Bavaria, may have been Hitler's first association with the Kaiserreich nobility. At the outbreak of World War I, Ludwig III received a petition from Adolf Hitler, asking for permission to join the Bavarian Army. The petition was granted and Hitler joined the Bavarian Army, where he served the remainder of WWI.

As the war drew to a close, the German Revolution broke out in Bavaria, and Ludwig III was the first Kaiserreich monarch to be deposed.
On 7 November 1918, Ludwig fled from Munich with his family to Schloss Anif, near Salzburg. On 12 November 1918, King Ludwig gave Prime Minister Dandl the Anif declaration, releasing all government officials, soldiers and civil officers from their oath of loyalty to him. The republican government of Kurt Eisner declared the Wittelsbachs deposed, ending 700 years of Wittelsbacher rule over Bavaria.
Rupprecht, Crown Prince of Bavaria – Ludwig's son and heir, did not join the far right in Germany, despite Hitler's attempts to win him over through Ernst Röhm and promises of royal restoration. In 1932, a plan to give Rupprecht dictatorial powers in Bavaria under the title of Staatskommissar, attracted support from the Social Democratic Party of Germany, and the Bavarian Minister-President Wilhelm Hoegner, but the Bavarian government under Heinrich Held ended all hopes for the idea. Rupprecht continued to harbor the idea of the restoration of the Bavarian monarchy, in a possible union with Austria as an independent Southern Germany.

In a memorandum in 1943, Prince Rupprecht even mentioned his ambition for the German crown, (of the Kaiserreich), which had been held by the House of Wittelsbach in the past.

Kingdom of Saxony

(Abolished 13 November 1918)

King Frederick Augustus III of Saxony

Frederick Augustus III was the last King of Saxony and a member of the House of Wettin. He voluntarily abdicated as King on 13 November 1918. When the German Republic was proclaimed in 1918, he was asked by telephone whether he would abdicate willingly. He said: "Oh, well, I suppose I'd better." Upon abdicating, he is supposed to have said "Nu da machd doch eiern Drägg alleene!" (Saxon for "Well then do your sh... by yourselves!"). When cheered by a crowd in a railroad station several years after his abdication, he stuck his head out of the train's window and shouted, "You're a fine lot of republicans, I'll say!" After his father's abdication in 1919, Georg, Crown Prince of Saxony, the king's first-born son and heir, renounced his rights on the Saxon throne to become a Catholic priest. This was very controversial among people who hoped that the monarchy might one day be restored. He worked in Berlin where he was credited with protecting Jews from the Nazi regime in notable contrast to his pro-Nazi brothers-in-law, Prince Frederich of Hohenzollern and Prince Franz Joseph of Hohenzolllern-Emden, who joined the SS. As a leading Roman Catholic nobleman and near relative of the Habsburg, Bourbon, and Saxon dynasties, Prince Franz Joseph did much to lend respectability to the Nazi party.

Kingdom of Württemberg

(Abolished 30 November 1918)

King William II of Wurttemberg

King William II abdicated on 30 November 1918. Princess Pauline was the elder daughter of William II of Württemberg. Princess Pauline was a first cousin of: Queen Wilhelmina of the Netherlands, and Princess Alice, Countess of Athlone, and senior Nazi Party members Charles Edward, Duke of Saxe-Coburg and Gotha and Josias, Hereditary Prince of Waldeck and Pyrmont. Princess Pauline was indicted by a United States Military Government court for "having concealed two prominent Nazis since October 1945." The princess admitted "having deliberately provided a haven" for Gertrud Scholtz-Klink and her husband, former Maj. General August Heissmayer of the SS. The Princess had acknowledged knowing that "Scholtz-Klink was known as the chief of all Nazi women's organizations," but she denied awareness of Heissmayer's SS position. Scholtz-Klink told the authorities that she did not know whether "Adolf Hitler was alive or dead," but "as long as he lives in the hearts of his followers, he cannot die."

Grand Duchy of Baden

(Abolished 22 November 1918)

Frederick II, Grand Duke of Baden

Grand Duke Frederick II abdicated on 22 November 1918, during the German Revolution of 1918–19 which resulted in the abolition of the Grand Duchy. After his death in 1928, the headship of the house was transferred over to his great uncles grandson, Prince Maximilian of Baden. His successor Prince Maximilian, was the Chancellor of Germany and Minister President of Prussia, and the chief negotiator of the Kaiserreich abdication. Prince Max was married to Princess Marie Louise of Hanover, eldest daughter of Ernest Augustus II and Thyra of Denmark. Prince Max's son Prince Berthold of Baden married Princess Theodora, daughter of Prince Andrew of Greece and Denmark and Princess Alice of Battenberg. As such, Prince Berthold was brother-in-law to Prince Philip, Duke of Edinburgh and eventually Elizabeth II. In 1920 with Kurt Hahn, Prince Max established the Schule Schloss Salem school attended by Prince Philip. Kurt Hahn also founded Gordonstoun in Scotland attended by Philips heir, Prince Charles.

Grand Duchy of Hesse

(Abolished 9 November 1918)

Prince Frederick Charles of Hesse

Prince Frederick Charles was the brother-in-law of the German Emperor Wilhelm II. Frederick Charles was elected as the King of Finland by the Parliament of Finland on 9 October 1918. However, with the abdication of Emperor Wilhelm II of Germany ending monarchies in Germany, Finland adopted a republican constitution. His first son Philipp, Landgrave of Hesse joined the Nazi Party in 1930, and the SA. Stormtroopers in 1932. In 1933, his three other brothers joined the (SS) and the SA. Prince Philipp of Hesse became a particularly close friend of Hermann Göring, the future head of the Luftwaffe. After Hindenburg's appointment of Adolf Hitler as Chancellor in 1933, Philipp was appointed Oberpräsident (Governor) of Hesse-Nassau, and a member of the Reichstag, and of the Prussian Staatsrat. Philipp played an important role in the consolidation of Nazi rule in Germany. He introduced other aristocrats to NSDAP officials and, as son-in-law of the king of Italy, was a frequent go-between for Hitler and Benito Mussolini. As Governor of Hesse-Kassel, Philipp was complicit in the T-4 Euthanasia Program. In February 1941, Philipp signed the contract placing the sanitarium of Hadamar Clinic at the disposal of the Reich Interior Ministry. Over 10,000 mentally ill people were murdered there. In 1946, Prince Philipp of Hesse was charged with murder, but the charges were later dropped.

Prince Frederick's other son Prince Christoph of Hesse was a SS. Schutzstaffel officer. Prince Christophe was a director in the Ministry of Aviation, Commander of the Air Reserves, with a rank of Oberführer in the SS. In 1943, he was killed in an airplane accident in a war zone near Italy. Prince Christoph was a great-grandson of Queen Victoria and Prince Albert of Saxe-Coburg and Gotha through their daughter Victoria, Princess Royal, wife of Frederick III, German Emperor. Christoph married Princess Sophie of Greece and Denmark. Princess Sophie was the youngest daughter of Prince Andrew of Greece and Denmark and Princess Alice of Battenberg, and the sister of the future Prince Philip, Duke of Edinburgh.

Prince Wilhelm of Hesse was heir to the Hesse-Philippsthal line. Prince Wilhelm was the eldest child of Prince Chlodwig of Hesse and Princess Caroline of Solms-Hohensolms-Lich. In 1932 he joined the Nazi Party and SS, rising to the rank SS-Hauptsturmführer. Prince Wilhelm married Princess Marianne, the daughter of Prince Friedrich Wilhelm of Prussia. During WWII Prince Wilhelm refused to join an SS unit, instead switching to the regular German Army, where he became a captain of infantry. He was killed in action during the fighting at Gor on the Eastern Front.

Grand Duchy of Hesse and by Rhine

(Abolished 9 November 1918)

Ernest Louis, Grand Duke of Hesse

During World War I, Grand Duke Ernest Louis served as an officer at Kaiser Wilhelm's headquarters. In July 1918, roughly sixteen months after the February Revolution, which forced his brother-in-law, Nicholas II from his throne, Ernst's two sisters in Russia, Elizabeth, who had become a nun following the assassination of her husband, Grand Duke Sergei, in 1905, and Alexandra, the former tsarina, were killed by the Bolsheviks. At the end of the war, he lost his throne during the revolution of 1918, after refusing to abdicate. Ernst was the last Grand Duke of Hesse and by Rhine from 1892 until 1918.

Grand Duchy of Mecklenburg-Schwerin

(Abolished 14 November 1918)

Frederick Francis IV, Grand Duke of Mecklenburg-Schwerin

Following the 1918 suicide of Grand Duke Adolphus Frederick VI of Mecklenburg-Strelitz, Grand Duke Frederick Francis took up the regency of Strelitz, after the heir presumptive Duke Charles Michael, who was serving in the Russian Army at the time and had indicated that he wished to renounce his succession rights. Friedrich Franz abdicated the grand ducal throne on 14 November 1918 following the German Empire's defeat in World War I; the regency ended at the same time. His son Friedrich Franz joined the Schutzstaffel (SS), and by 1936 held rank of Hauptsturmführer (Captain). He was posted to Denmark during WWII where he worked at the German embassy as a personal aide to Werner Best. He spent 1944 serving with the Waffen-SS tank corps. In May 1943, Friedrich Franz was passed over as heir in favour of his younger brother Duke Christian Louis.

Grand Duchy of Oldenburg

(Abolished 11 November 1918)

Frederick Augustus II, Grand Duke of Oldenburg

Grand Duke Frederick was forced to abdicate his throne at the end of World War I, when the former Grand Duchy of the German Empire joined the post-war German Republic. He and his family took up residence at Rastede Castle, where he took up farming and local industrial interests. A year after his abdication, he asked the Oldenburg Diet for a yearly allowance of 150,000 marks, stating that his financial condition was "extremely precarious". In 1931, Frederick died in Rastede.

Grand Duchy of Saxe-Weimar-Eisenach

(Abolished 9 November 1918)

William Ernest, Grand Duke of Saxe-Weimar-Eisenach

Grand Duke Wilhelm Ernst was in line for the Netherlands throne (as the grandson of Princess Sophie of the Netherlands) after Queen Wilhelmina. The Dutch feared annexation of the Netherlands, to prevent this, lawyers tried to change the constitution to exclude Wilhelm Ernst. Another proposal, was that if Wilhelmina would die childless, then he or his offspring would have to choose between the Dutch and the Weimar throne. The birth of Wilhelmina's daughter Juliana of the Netherlands in 1909 lessened the chance for the house of Wettin to inherit the Dutch throne. On 9 November 1918 Wilhelm Ernst – along with the rest of the Kaiserreich monarchs – was forced to abdicate. His throne and lands were relinquished and he fled with his family to the family estate in Silesia, where he died five years later. Despite all his work for Weimar during his government, Wilhelm Ernst was a hated ruler. In his private life, he was known as a sadist. On the day of his abdication, he was called the "most unpopular prince in all Germany".

Duchy of Anhalt

(Abolished 12 November 1918)

Joachim Ernst, Duke of Anhalt

Joachim Ernst succeeded his father as Duke of Anhalt on September 13, 1918, however due to his age his uncle Prince Aribert of Anhalt was appointed regent. His brief reign came to an end on November 12, 1918 with his uncle abdicating in his name following the German revolution. The duchy became the Free State of Anhalt.

Duchy of Brunswick

(Abolished 8 November 1918)

Prince Ernest Augustus, 3rd Duke of Cumberland and Teviotdale

Ernst August, Crown Prince of Hanover, was the only son of George V of Hanover and Marie of Saxe-Altenburg. Although he was the senior male-line great-grandson of George III, the Duke of Cumberland was deprived of his British peerages and honours for having sided with Germany in World War I. Ernst August was the last Hanoverian prince to hold a British royal title. His successor Ernst Augustus, Duke of Brunswick and Prince of Hanover, Prince of Great Britain and Ireland, was the youngest child of Crown Prince Ernest Augustus and Princess Thyra. When Ernest's older brother Prince George died, the German Emperor sent a message of condolence to the Duke. In response the Duke sent his only surviving son, Ernst, to thank the Emperor. In Berlin, Ernst met Emperor William II's only daughter, Princess Victoria Louise of Prussia. Ernest and Victoria Louise married in 1913. The wedding was the last great gathering of European sovereigns; German Emperor and Empress, Duke and Duchess of Cumberland, George V and Queen Mary of the UK, and Tsar Nicholas II attended. On 8 November 1918, he was forced to abdicate his throne along with the other Kaiserreich nobility. The next year, his father's British dukedom was suspended under the Titles Deprivation Act 1917. In 1947 his daughter Frederica became Queen of the Hellenes when her husband Prince Paul of Greece and Denmark succeeded as King. He died in 1953.

Duchy of Saxe-Altenburg

(Abolished 13 November 1918)

Ernst II, Duke of Saxe-Altenburg

When Germany lost the war, all the German princes lost their titles and states. Ernst was one of the first princes to realize major changes were coming for Germany, and quickly arrived at an amicable settlement with his subjects. He was forced to abdicate the government of the duchy on 13 November 1918, and spent the rest of his life like a private citizen. On 1 May 1937 Ernst joined the Nazi party Ernst became the only former reigning German prince who accepted German Democratic Republic citizenship after World War II, refusing an offer to leave his beloved Schloß Fröhliche Wiederkunft and relocate to the British occupation zone. The Schloß had been confiscated by the Soviet occupiers, but Ernst had been granted free use of it until his death. In March 1954, with the death of Charles Edward, Duke of Saxe-Coburg and Gotha, he became the last survivor of the German princes who had reigned until 1918. One year later, on 22 March 1955, he died at his Schloß.

Duchy of Saxe-Coburg and Gotha

(Abolished 14 November 1918)

Charles Edward, was the last reigning Duke of Saxe-Coburg and Gotha, and the head of the House of Saxe-Coburg and Gotha until his death in 1954. A male-line grandson of Queen Victoria and Prince Albert, he was also until 1919 a Prince of the United Kingdom as the Duke of Albany. The Duke was a controversial figure in the UK due to his status as Sovereign Duke of Saxe-Coburg and Gotha, part of the German Empire, during World War I. He was deprived of his British peerages, his title of Prince and Royal Highness and his British honours in 1919. In 1918, he was forced to abdicate his ducal throne. In World War I Charles Edward held a commission as a general in the German Army. Consequently, George V ordered his name removed from the register of the Knights of the Garter in 1915. In July 1917, he and his children had the Royal Arms insignia removed from their (Saxe-Coburg and Gotha) coats of arms, they also lost their titles of Prince and Princess of the United Kingdom and the styles Royal Highness and Highness. He retained the style Highness of a sovereign ducal house in Germany, until 18 November 1918 when a Workers' and Soldiers' Council of Gotha deposed him. On 23 November he signed a declaration relinquishing his rights to the throne.

In 1977, Ottfried Neubecker, Director of the German General Rolls of Arms and of the Board of the International Academy of Heraldry, with the cooperation of J.P. Brooke-Little from the College of Arms, published "A Little Brown Book," later reprinted in 1988/89/97 as " Heraldry. Sources, Symbols and Meaning".. On page 96, Neubecker stated that; "The reigning royal family in Great Britain goes back to Prince Albert of Saxe-Coburg, husband of Queen Victoria. Our summary of the family tree covers all those descended in the male line from Queen Victoria. As the princes of Saxe-Coburg and Gotha were excluded from the British royal family in 1893, the labels chosen independently by them were not recognized in England. (Also), on 17 July 1917 the name of Saxe-Coburg was changed to Windsor." By warrant of Sep. 12, 1917 and subsequent Order in Council of 1919, George V removed the inescutcheon of Saxony from the arms of all descendants of the Prince Consort.
Of George's 29 first-cousins on his father's side, 19 were German, the rest half-German; while on his mother's side, of the 31 first-cousins, six were German and 25 half-German.

In 1919, most, if not all of these Saxe-Coburg Gotha princes lost their titles and royal status, in accordance with the Weimar Constitution, which abolished their German monarchy. Although according to Neubecker; the princes of Saxe-Coburg and Gotha , the labels chosen independently by them were not recognized in England. Following the successions to the British throne of two such (Saxe-Coburg and Gotha) princes; as king Edward VII, and king George V, 

In 1932, Charles Edward took part in the creation of the Harzburg Front, through which the German National People's Party became associated with the Nazi Party. Charles Edward was a member of the (NSDAP), and formally joined the Nazi Party in 1935, becoming a member of the SA (Brownshirts), rising to rank of Obergruppenführer. Obergruppenführer, was the highest commissioned SS rank, inferior only to Reichsführer-SS (Heinrich Himmler). Charles Edward held the same rank as Prince Josias of Waldeck and Pyrmont, Rudolf Hess, von Ribbentrop, Martin Bormann, and Reinhard Heydrich. Charles Edward was also a member of the Reichstag representing the Nazi Party. In 1936, Adolf Hitler sent Charles Edward to Britain as president of the Anglo-German Friendship Society. His mission was to improve Anglo-German relations and to explore the possibility of a pact between the two countries. He sent Hitler encouraging reports about the strength of pro-German sentiment among the British aristocracy. After the Abdication Crisis, he played host to the Duke and Duchess of Windsor, during their private tour of Germany in 1937.

 

Ernst II, Prince of Hohenlohe-Langenburg, was a German aristocrat, and the Regent of the Duchy of Saxe-Coburg and Gotha during the minority of his wife's cousin, Duke Charles Edward, from 1900 to 1905. Ernst was the oldest of three children, and the only son, of Hermann, Prince of Hohenlohe-Langenburg, and Princess Leopoldine of Baden. He married the Queen Victoria's granddaughter, Princess Alexandra of Edinburgh, daughter of The Prince Alfred, Duke of Saxe-Coburg and Gotha and Duke of Edinburgh and Grand Duchess Maria Alexandrovna. After Adolf Hitler came to power in 1933, Ernst joined his son Gottfried, Prince of Hohenlohe (who had already entered in 1931) in the Nazi Party. Prince Gottfried, the son of Ernst II, Prince of Hohenlohe married Princess Margarita, who was one of the sisters of Prince Philip, Duke of Edinburgh, the consort of Queen Elizabeth II.

Princess Alexandra of Saxe-Coburg and Gotha (Hohenlohe) joined the Nazi Party, in 1937, together with several of her children.

Duchy of Saxe-Meiningen

(Abolished 10 November 1918)

Bernhard III, Duke of Saxe-Meiningen

Bernhard assumed the duchy of Saxe-Meiningen after the death of his father in 1914. When Germany lost the war, all the German princes lost their titles and states. Bernhard was forced to abdicate as duke on 10 November 1918, and spent the rest of his life in his former country as a private citizen. His wife Princess Charlotte of Prussia was the second child of Prince Frederick of Prussia and Princess Victoria. Charlotte was the eldest granddaughter of Queen Victoria and Prince Albert of Saxe-Coburg-Gotha. She was well loved by her paternal grandparents King Wilhelm I and Queen Augusta, and close to her brother Wilhelm II.

Georg, Prince of Saxe-Meiningen was the head of the house of Saxe-Meiningen from 1941 until his death. , Georg was the eldest son of Prince Frederick Johann of Saxe-Meiningen (1861–1914) and Countess Adelaide of Lippe-Biesterfeld (1870–1948). His uncle Bernhard III abdicated on 10 November 1918 following the German Revolution. In 1933 he joined the Nazi Party. Georg died in the Russian prisoner of war camp in Northern Russia. His heir was his second and only surviving son Prince Frederick Alfred who renounced the succession, being a monk in 1953, allowing it to pass to his uncle Bernhard.

Principality of Lippe

(Abolished 12 November 1918)

Leopold IV, Prince of Lippe

Prince Leopold IV, was forced to renounce the throne on 12 November 1918. Following the end of his rule Lippe became a Free state in the new Weimar Republic. All three of his sons by his first wife became members of the party. His eldest son Prince Ernst is reported to have been the first German prince to join the party when he signed up in May 1928. When Leopold died in Detmold his three eldest sons were all disinherited and his youngest son Armin, Prince of Lippe became head of the house.

Princess Marie Adelheid of Lippe was the daughter of Count Rudolph and Princess Luise of Ardeck. In 1920, Marie Adelheid married Prince Heinrich XXXII, who had once been close to succeeding Queen Wilhelmina to the Dutch throne. They divorced in 1921. Marie Adelheid married thirdly to Hanno Konopath, a Nazi government official in 1927. This marriage created some important contacts for her in the German regime.

Like the Hesse family, the Lippe dynasty joined the Nazi party in great numbers (ultimately eighteen members would eventually join). Some German states provided a proportionally higher number of SS officers, including Hesse-Nassau and Lippe, Marie Adelheid's birthplace. Marie Adelheid developed strong connections with the Nazi regime, and became a leading socialite during that time. In 1921, Marie Adelheid became employed as an aide to the Nazi Minister of Food and Agriculture, Richard Walther Darré (a friend of her third husband's). Her cousin Ernst, Prince of Lippe (son of Leopold IV, Prince of Lippe) was also employed under Darré. Marie Adelheid devoted her writing talent to promoting Nazi ideals, in particular those of Darré. Darré's views suffered as new plans were produced by Himmler and Göring. As Darré's influence declined, so did that of Marie Adelheid and her cousin.

Principality of Schaumburg-Lippe

(Abolished 15 November 1918)

Adolf II, Prince of Schaumburg-Lippe

Adolph succeeded his father as Prince in 1911, until he was forced to abdicate on 15 November 1918. Following the German revolution: the Principality became the Free State of Schaumburg-Lippe. Adolf married Ellen Bischoff-Korthaus, they were both killed in a plane crash in Mexico in 1936, in a controlled flight into the side of a volcano. He was succeeded as head of the House of Schaumburg-Lippe by his brother Wolrad.

Prince Adolph's brother Prince Friedrich Christian, was son of Georg, the reigning Prince of Schaumburg-Lippe, and Princess Marie Anne. Friedrich's brother Adolf II was the "last German prince forced to abdicate. After WWI, Friedrich Christian was an ardent Nazi Party supporter, and worked vigorously to gain noble and royal support for it, and eventually became an upper privy councillor and adjutant to Propaganda Minister Joseph Goebbels. In 1939, Friedrich Christian was asked to become king of Iceland by Icelanders sympathetic to the Nazi party, but refused due to the opposition of Foreign Minister Joachim von Ribbentrop. Prince Friedrich felt disillusioned by the abdication of Emperor Wilhelm II, and even more unhappy over the "cowardly abdications" of the German princes in 1918. The prince wished for a restoration of the monarchy, he believed that Adolf Hitler was also in tandem with these views, writing in his diary, "Hitler was in principle for the monarchy, but not for the continuation of that which, in his opinion, had failed totally." The prince "liked to think the "National Socialists as true heirs of the old nobility." 

The House of Schaumburg-Lippe had ten members in the Nazi party. Hitler wanted these high-ranking members of society for propaganda reasons – the more who joined, the more socially acceptable his new regime would be. Like Friedrich and his brother Prince Wolrad, Hitler appointed many of these new members to the Sturmabteilung as stormtroopers. Hitler made various assurances to its members, leading them to believe he intended to restore the monarchy.
Friedrich Christian was a speaker for the Nazi Party in 1929, and worked vigorously to gain the support of other noble families behind Hitler. He worked closely with Propaganda Minister Joseph Goebbels.> Goebbels gave him a position in the newly created Ministry of Public Enlightenment and Propaganda. By April 1933, Friedrich Christian was both an upper privy councillor and Goebbels' adjutant. That year, the prince arranged for the Minister's involvement in the Berlin University book burning. As evident from photographs and diaries during that time, Hitler and Goebbels both held Friedrich Christian in high esteem. As WWII continued with German military defeats, Hitler became more suspicious of royal and noble families, questioning their loyalties. By 1943, he secretly ordered all Nazi bureaucracies to compile a record of members, and then personally decided if they were to be "retired" or allowed to stay. Most of the princes were unwillingly booted out of the party as a result. Goebbels went to Hitler to protect Friedrich Christian, who obtained a special waiver, for the prince's "future deployment in the Propaganda Ministry".

In 1947, four German princes Friedrich Christian, Prince August Wilhelm of Prussia, Prince Philipp of Hesse, and Hereditary Prince Ernst of Lippe, were brought under arrest to the war crimes jail at Nuremberg in order to appear as witnesses in a portion of the 16 trials of high-ranking Nazi criminals. Viewed as an "old-line party member" who made propaganda excursions to many foreign countries on Goebbels' behalf, Friedrich Christian was the last of the four to testify.

Principality of Schwarzburg

(Abolished 22 November 1918)

Günther Victor, Prince of Schwarzburg (1852–1925) was the final sovereign prince of Schwarzburg-Rudolstadt and Schwarzburg-Sondershausen, and also the last German royal to abdicate in the wake of the November Revolution of 1918. Following the outbreak of the German revolution Prince Günther abdicated on 22 November 1918. Following his death in Sondershausen he was succeeded as head of the House of Schwarzburg by Prince Sizzo. Died childless.

Principality of Waldeck-Pyrmont

(Abolished 13 November 1918)

Friedrich, Prince of Waldeck and Pyrmont

Friedrich, Prince of Waldeck and Pyrmont (Friedrich Adolf Hermann Prinz zu Waldeck und Pyrmont; 20 January 1865 – 26 May 1946) was the last reigning Prince of Waldeck and Pyrmont from 12 May 1893 to 13 November 1918.

Josias, Hereditary Prince of Waldeck and Pyrmont was the heir apparent to Waldeck and Pyrmont. At the end of WWI, his family lost their Principality as Waldeck and Pyrmont became a Free State in the new Weimar Republic.

On 1 November 1929, Josias joined Adolf Hitler's Nazi Party, becoming a member of the SS in 1930. He was immediately appointed adjutant to Sepp Dietrich (a leading member of the SS), before becoming Heinrich Himmler's Adjutant and staff chief in September 1930. Waldeck-Pyrmont was elected as the Reichstag member for Düsseldorf-West in 1933 and was promoted to the rank of SS Lieutenant General. He was promoted again in 1939, to the Higher SS and Police Leader for Weimar. In this position he had supervisory authority over Buchenwald concentration camp. After World War II, he was sentenced to life in prison at the Buchenwald Trial (later commuted to 20 years) for his part in the "common plan" to violate the Laws and Usages of War in connection with prisoners of war held at Buchenwald concentration camp, but was released after serving about three years in prison. He was the nephew of William II, King of Württemberg, and Emma of Waldeck and Pyrmont, Queen Regent of the Netherlands. He was also a cousin of Wilhelmina, Queen of the Netherlands, and Charles Edward, Duke of Saxe-Coburg and Gotha.

Prince Josias's and his wife, Duchess Altburg of Oldenburg were the parents of Wittekind, Prince of Waldeck and Pyrmont. Adolf Hitler and Heinrich Himmler were his godfathers. Wittekind, who served in the German Armed Forces as a Lieutenant Colonel, succeeded as head of the House of Waldeck and Pyrmont when his father died on 30 November 1967.

Principality of Reuss-Greiz

(Abolished 10 November 1918)

Heinrich XXIV, Prince Reuss of Greiz (1878–1927) was the last reigning Prince Reuss of Greiz from 1902 to 1918. Then he became Head of the House Reuss of Greiz which became extinct at his death in 1927. At the death of father on 19 April 1902, Heinrich XXIV succeeded as the Prince Reuss of Greiz. Because of the physical and mental disability of Heinrich XXIV, the result of an accident in his childhood, Heinrich XIV, Prince Reuss Younger Line served as regent of Reuss Elder Line from 1902 until his death in 1913; the regency continued thereafter under Heinrich XIV's successor, Heinrich XXVII, until the abolition of the German monarchies in 1918.

Principality of Reuss-Gera (Younger Line)

(Abolished 11 November 1918)

At the death of his father on 29 March 1913, Heinrich inherited the throne of the Principality, as well he continued the regency of Reuss Elder Line, because of a physical and mental disability of Prince Heinrich XXIV due to an accident in his childhood. Prince Heinrich XXVII abdicated in 1918 after the German Revolution of 1918–19, when all German monarchies were abolished. After the death of Heinrich XXIV, Prince Reuss Elder Line in 1927, the titles passed to Heinrich XXVII.

Heinrich XLV, Hereditary Prince Reuss Younger Line

Heinrich XLV was the head of the House of Reuss, and last male member of the Reuss-Schleiz branch of the Younger Line. Heinrich XLV was the only surviving son of Heinrich XXVII. During the 1930s Heinrich XLV became a Nazi sympathizer and member of the Nazi Party. In 1945 he was arrested by the Soviet military and disappeared. In 1962, he was declared dead by a court in Büdingen.

See also

 List of German monarchs in 1918
 Abdication of Wilhelm II
 List of Nazi Party leaders and officials
 Glossary of Nazi Germany

References

Sources